Boneh-ye Fakhr-e Bala (also Romanized as Boneh-ye Fākhr-e Bālā) is a village in Howmeh-ye Gharbi Rural District, in the Central District of Ramhormoz County, Khuzestan Province, Iran. At the 2006 census, its population was 143, in 23 families.

References 

Populated places in Ramhormoz County